Theodore Harold Reed (July 25, 1922 -July 2, 2013) was an American veterinarian and zoologist.

Life
He was born at Walter Reed Army Hospital in Washington, D.C.

He graduated from Kansas State College (now Kansas State University) in veterinary medicine and zoology.
He served as the veterinarian at the Portland Zoo in Oregon.

He joined the National Zoological Park (United States) in 1955. 
He was named associate director in 1956, and director in 1958. 
In 1972, he helped bring the pandas Ling-Ling and Hsing-Hsing to the National Zoo.
In 1975, he helped create the Smithsonian Conservation Biology Institute.

He died in a nursing home in Milford, Delaware.

References

1922 births
2013 deaths
American zoologists
People from Washington, D.C.
Kansas State University alumni
Smithsonian Institution people